McGhee is a surname. People with the surname include:

People with the surname
Alison McGhee (born 1960), American author
Bill McGhee (1905–1984), American baseball player
Brian McGhee (born 1984), American murderer and former professional wrestler known as DT Porter for the WWE
Brownie McGhee (1915–1996), American blues musician
Carla McGhee (born 1968), American basketball player
Darius McGhee (born 1999), American basketball player
David McGhee (born 1976), English football player
Doc McGhee (born 1950), American band manager
Ed McGhee (1924–1986), American baseball player
Ethel McGhee Davis (1899–1990), American educator, social worker, and college administrator
Fredrick McGhee (1861–1912), American lawyer and civil rights activist 
Gary McGhee (born 1988), American basketball player
George C. McGhee (1912–2005), American geologist and diplomat
George Louis McGhee (1925–2000), American marriage and family therapist
George McGhee (footballer) (1883–1944), English footballer
Gerry McGhee (1962–2020), Canadian singer
Heather McGhee (born 1980), American author
Henry McGhee (1898–1959), British dentist and politician
Howard McGhee (1918–1987), American jazz musician
James McGhee (1862–1941), Scottish football player
James William McGhee (1882–1968), American inventor
Jim McGhee (born 1930), Scottish footballer
Jimmy McGhee (active 1920s), United States-based soccer player
Joe McGhee (1929 - 2015), Scottish marathon runner
Jordan McGhee (born 1996), Scottish football player 
Joseph McGhee (1872 - 1951), American politician
Kanavis McGhee (born 1968), American football player 
Lorna McGhee (born 1972), Scottish flutist and teacher
Mark McGhee (born 1957), Scottish football player and coach
Melissa McGhee (born 1984), American singer
Monta McGhee (born 1979), American basketball player
Richard McGhee (1851–1930), Irish merchant and politician
Sticks McGhee (1918–1961), American blues guitarist
Thomas McGhee (born 1929), English footballer
Timothy Joseph McGhee (born 1973), American mass murderer
William McGhee (1930–2007), American actor

See also
McGhee family, an ancient lowland family of Scotland
McGhee Tyson Airport, near Knoxville, Tennessee, United States
Ghee
Magee (disambiguation)
McGee (disambiguation)
McGhie
McGehee, Arkansas
McGehee (surname)